Buhl is a city in Saint Louis County, Minnesota, United States. Its population was 1,000 at the 2010 census.

U.S. Highway 169 serves as a main route in the community.

The city's motto is "The Finest Water in America".

History
A post office called Buhl has been in operation since 1900. The city was named for Frank H. Buhl, a businessperson in the mining industry. Buhl was incorporated in 1901.

Geography

Water
Buhl is noted for its pure water, supplied by a glacial aquifer located 700 feet deep below the surface, encased in 300 feet of solid granite. This is reflected in the city's motto, prominently displayed on the town's water tower.

Demographics

2010 census

As of the census of 2010, there were 1,000 people, 430 households, and 228 families living in the city. The racial makeup of the city was 93.7% White, 1.7% African American, 2.1% Native American, 0.4% Asian, and 2.1% from two or more races. Hispanic or Latino of any race were 0.3% of the population.

There were 430 households, of which 25.1% had children under the age of 18 living with them, 39.8% were married couples living together, 8.1% had a female householder with no husband present, 5.1% had a male householder with no wife present, and 47.0% were non-families. 40.2% of all households were made up of individuals, and 18.6% had someone living alone who was 65 years of age or older. The average household size was 2.11 and the average family size was 2.88.

The median age in the city was 42 years. 22.7% of residents were under the age of 18; 6.2% were between the ages of 18 and 24; 24.1% were from 25 to 44; 26.1% were from 45 to 64; and 20.9% were 65 years of age or older. The gender makeup of the city was 52.8% male and 47.2% female.

2000 census

As of the census of 2000, there were 983 people, 405 households, and 240 families living in the city. The racial makeup of the city was 94.91% White, 0.71% African American, 2.75% Native American, 0.20% Asian, 0.31% from other races, and 1.12% from two or more races. Hispanic or Latino of any race were 0.51% of the population. 20.5% were of Finnish, 15.1% German, 10.7% Italian, 6.8% English and 5.8% Norwegian ancestry.

There were 405 households, out of which 25.4% had children under the age of 18 living with them, 46.7% were married couples living together, 8.9% had a female householder with no husband present, and 40.5% were non-families. 35.1% of all households were made up of individuals, and 18.3% had someone living alone who was 65 years of age or older.  The average household size was 2.21 and the average family size was 2.87.

In the city, the population was spread out, with 25.9% under the age of 18, 7.9% from 18 to 24, 24.1% from 25 to 44, 22.4% from 45 to 64, and 19.6% who were 65 years of age or older.  The median age was 39 years. For every 100 females, there were 118.4 males.  For every 100 females age 18 and over, there were 101.1 males.

The median income for a household in the city was $31,574, and the median income for a family was $34,464. Males had a median income of $35,938 versus $21,538 for females. The per capita income for the city was $14,828.  About 7.2% of families and 13.2% of the population were below the poverty line, including 21.9% of those under age 18 and 11.0% of those age 65 or over.

Politics

References

External links
 Buhl Public Library – Website

Cities in Minnesota
Cities in St. Louis County, Minnesota
Mining communities in Minnesota
1901 establishments in Minnesota
Populated places established in 1901